Everlasting is an EP by Swedish hardcore punk band Refused, released in 1994 on Startrec records in Sweden and Equal Vision Records in the United States. The music features a metalcore style.

Track listing
"Burn It" – 3:13
"Symbols" – 3:41
"Sunflower Princess" – 2:00
"Everlasting" – 2:29
"I Am Not Me" – 3:08
"The Real" – 2:34
"Pretty Face" – 5:30

Personnel 
 Band
 Dennis Lyxzén – lead vocals
 Pär Hansson – guitar
 Kristofer Steen – guitar
 Magnus Flagge – bass guitar
 David Sandström – drums, percussion

 Production
 Refused – production
 Thomas Skogsberg – production, mixing
 Fred Estby – production, engineer, mixing
 Olé Christiansen – photography
 Ian Richter – design

References

1994 EPs
Refused albums